The 1998 California 500 Presented by NAPA was a NASCAR Winston Cup Series race held on May 3, 1998, at California Speedway in Fontana, California. Contested over 250 laps on the  speedway, it was the 10th race of the 1998 NASCAR Winston Cup Series season. Mark Martin of Roush Racing won the race.

Background
The track's turns are banked from fourteen degrees, while the front stretch, the location of the finish line, is banked at eleven degrees. Unlike the front stretch, the backstraightaway is banked at three degrees.

Top 10 results

Race Statistics
 Time of race: 3:33:57
 Average Speed: 
 Pole Speed: 
 Cautions: 6 for 35 laps
 Margin of Victory: 1.287 sec
 Lead changes: 18
 Percent of race run under caution: 14%         
 Average green flag run: 30.7 laps

References

California 500
California 500
NASCAR races at Auto Club Speedway